Lemrabott El Hacen (Arabic: لمرابوت الحسن; born 24 March 1997) is a Mauritanian professional footballer who plays as a defender for Super D1 club Nouadhibou and the Mauritania national team.

Honours 
Nouadhibou

 Super D1: 2017–18, 2018–19, 2019–20, 2020–21
 Mauritanian President's Cup: 2017, 2018
 Mauritanian Super Cup: 2018

References

External links 
 
 

1997 births
Living people
People from Nouakchott
Mauritanian footballers
Association football defenders
FC Nouadhibou players
Super D1 players
Mauritania international footballers
Mauritania A' international footballers
2018 African Nations Championship players